The 2021–22 Hockey East men's ice hockey season was the 38th season of play for Hockey East and took place during the 2021–22 NCAA Division I men's ice hockey season. The regular season began on October 2, 2021, and concluded on March 5, 2022. The conference tournament ended on March 19 with Massachusetts winning the championship.

Coaches
Ben Barr became the 8th head coach for Maine one month after the sudden death of his predecessor, Red Gendron.

Jerry Keefe was promoted to head coach after Jim Madigan became the athletic director for Northeastern.

Records

Standings

Non-Conference record
Of the sixteen teams that are selected to participate in the NCAA tournament, ten will be via at-large bids. Those 10 teams are determined based upon the PairWise rankings. The rankings take into account all games played but are heavily affected by intra-conference results. The result is that teams from leagues which perform better in non-conference are much more likely to receive at-large bids even if they possess inferior records overall.

Hockey East produced a good record during their non-conference schedule, however, the teams did not receive much of a benefit from those victories. The bulk of the leagues games were played against Atlantic Hockey and ECAC Hockey, the two weakest conferences this season. Despite finishing 20 games above .500 against those two combined, the improvement to each team's PairWise rankings was relatively small. The minimal bonus from these games was largely the cause for the conference's low rankings.

Regular season record

Statistics

Leading scorers
GP = Games played; G = Goals; A = Assists; Pts = Points

Leading goaltenders
Minimum 1/3 of team's minutes played in conference games.

GP = Games played; Min = Minutes played; W = Wins; L = Losses; T = Ties; GA = Goals against; SO = Shutouts; SV% = Save percentage; GAA = Goals against average

Conference tournament

NCAA tournament

Regional semifinal

Northeast Regional

West Regional

Ranking

USCHO

USA Today

Pairwise

Note: teams ranked in the top-10 automatically qualify for the NCAA tournament. Teams ranked 11-16 can qualify based upon conference tournament results.

Awards

NCAA

Hockey East

Conference tournament

2022 NHL Entry Draft

† incoming freshman

References

External links

2021-22
Hockey East
2021-22